Palmyre Levasseur (24 December 1888 – 4 August 1963) was a French stage and film actress.

Selected filmography
 Culprit (1937)
 Tricoche and Cacolet (1938)
 The Mondesir Heir (1940)
 The Emigrant (1940)
 The Stairs Without End  (1943)
 The Captain (1946)
 A Friend Will Come Tonight (1946)
 The Murderer is Not Guilty (1946)
 Goodbye Darling (1946)
 Love Around the House (1947)
 After Love (1948)
 Dark Sunday (1948)
 The Woman I Murdered (1948)
 Cage of Girls (1949)
 Eve and the Serpent (1949)
 Doctor Laennec (1949)
 The Heroic Monsieur Boniface (1949)
 Emile the African (1949)
 Atoll K (1951)
 Yours Truly, Blake (1954)
 Service Entrance (1954)
 Life Together (1958)

References

Bibliography
 Norbert Aping. The Final Film of Laurel and Hardy: A Study of the Chaotic Making and Marketing of Atoll K. McFarland, 2008.

External links

1888 births
1963 deaths
French film actresses
20th-century French actresses